Naruko Dam is a concrete gravity-arch dam in the city of Ōsaki,  Miyagi Prefecture, Japan, completed in 1958 by Kajima Corporation. The dam is located on the Eaigawa, the former main course of the Kitakami River.

Design
Naruko Dam is the first purely Japanese concrete gravity dam, and the third concrete gravity arch dam to be completed in Japan.  Construction took a seven-year period, between 1951 and 1958. The dam is intended for flood control, irrigation water and hydroelectric power.

References 

Dams in Miyagi Prefecture
Dams completed in 1958
Ōsaki, Miyagi
Hydroelectric power stations in Japan